The comparative military ranks of Korea are the military insignia used by the two nations on the Korean Peninsula, those being the Republic of Korea Armed Forces (South Korea) and the Korean People's Army of the Democratic People's Republic of Korea (North Korea). The United States Forces Korea personnel wear the ranks and insignia used by other service personnel of the United States Armed Forces in the territories of the United States.

In the South Korean armed forces, ranks fall into one of four categories: commissioned officer, warrant officer, non-commissioned officer, and junior enlisted ("Byeong"), in decreasing order of authority. Commissioned officer ranks are subdivided into general officers ("Jangseong"; 장성/將星), field-grade officers ("Yeonggwan"; 영관/領官), and company-grade officers ("Wigwan"; 위관/尉官). The ranks of all three branches (the Army, Navy, and Air Force) of the South Korean Armed Forces share the same titles in Hangul. Most ranks of South and North Korea are identical, with some exceptions such as the supreme North Korean ranks.

While the North Korean ranks are inspired by the Soviet ranks, the South Korean ranks are inspired by the United States.

The following table lists the comparative ranks of the militaries in Korea, including their rank titles and insignia. In this table, the North Korean military rank insignia shown is that of their Army field uniform shoulder boards; their parade uniforms and uniforms of other branches use alternative color schemes with the same basic design. The South Korean likewise have subdued versions of their insignia in each of their branches.

Special ranks

Officer ranks
The shoulder boards and sleeve stripes of South Korean ranks apply only to their navies. North Korea's People's Army does not maintain a separate marine corps or naval infantry branch as part of their armed forces, although it does maintain two "amphibious sniper brigades" as part of the North Korean Special Operation Force (NKSOF). North Korean insignia follow the Soviet pattern, while South Korean insignia follow a mix of American and British rank insignia traditions.

No one has held the five-star rank Wonsu in the history of the ROK Armed Forces.

Army ranks

All DPRK Marshalls wear Ground Force uniform as there is no division of Branch after this rank.

Air force ranks

Naval ranks
ROK Navy commissioned officer ranks have two distinct sets of rank insignia: On dress uniform a series of stripes similar to the United States Navy naval ranks are worn; on service uniforms, working uniforms, and special uniform situations (combat utilities and flight suits), the rank insignia are the same as the equivalent rank in the Army or the Air Force.

Marine Corps

Warrant officer ranks
All branches of the South Korean armed forces maintain a single Warrant Officer rank known as Junwi. Warrant Officers fall in between non-commissioned and commissioned officers. The rank is denoted by a gold-colored Sowi insignia and, in the case of the South Korean Navy, a single broken sleeve stripe. The North Korean military does not maintain any equivalent Warrant Officer positions.

Enlisted ranks
Both North Korea and South Korea share the same enlisted rank structure among all of their military branches. Enlisted rank insignia differ however: The ROKAF uses a mix of American, British, and French practice while the KPA's insignia follow Soviet practice.

In the South Korean armed forces, personnel with ranks of Hasa through Wonsa are considered non-commissioned officers. There are enlisted ranks called "Corporal" and "Sergeant" in English, but they are not considered non-commissioned officer ranks, though they are treated as one if they hold an NCO position. Ideungbyeong (Korean: 이등병; Hanja: 2等兵, sometimes translated as 2nd class private), Ildeungbyeong (일등병; 1等兵 sometimes translated as 1st class private), and Sangdeungbyeong (상등병; 上等兵, equivalent of a corporal) are commonly referred to as Ibyeong, Ilbyeong, and Sangbyeong respectively.

Army ranks

Air force ranks

Navy ranks
In reality, personnel in Sangsa and Wonsa rates are considered as chief petty officers (i.e. Chief Petty Officer and Master Chief Petty Officer, respectively) in the South Korean navy. Byeongjang and below are commonly referred to as "Subyeong" (seaman).

Marine Corps

See also
 Comparative military ranks
 Comparative army officer ranks of Asia

Notes
In the article, all South Korean ranks are spelled accordingly with the Revised Romanization of Korean system; all North Korean ranks use the McCune-Reischauer system.

References

 

 
 
Korea
Military comparisons